= Legitimation of nobility =

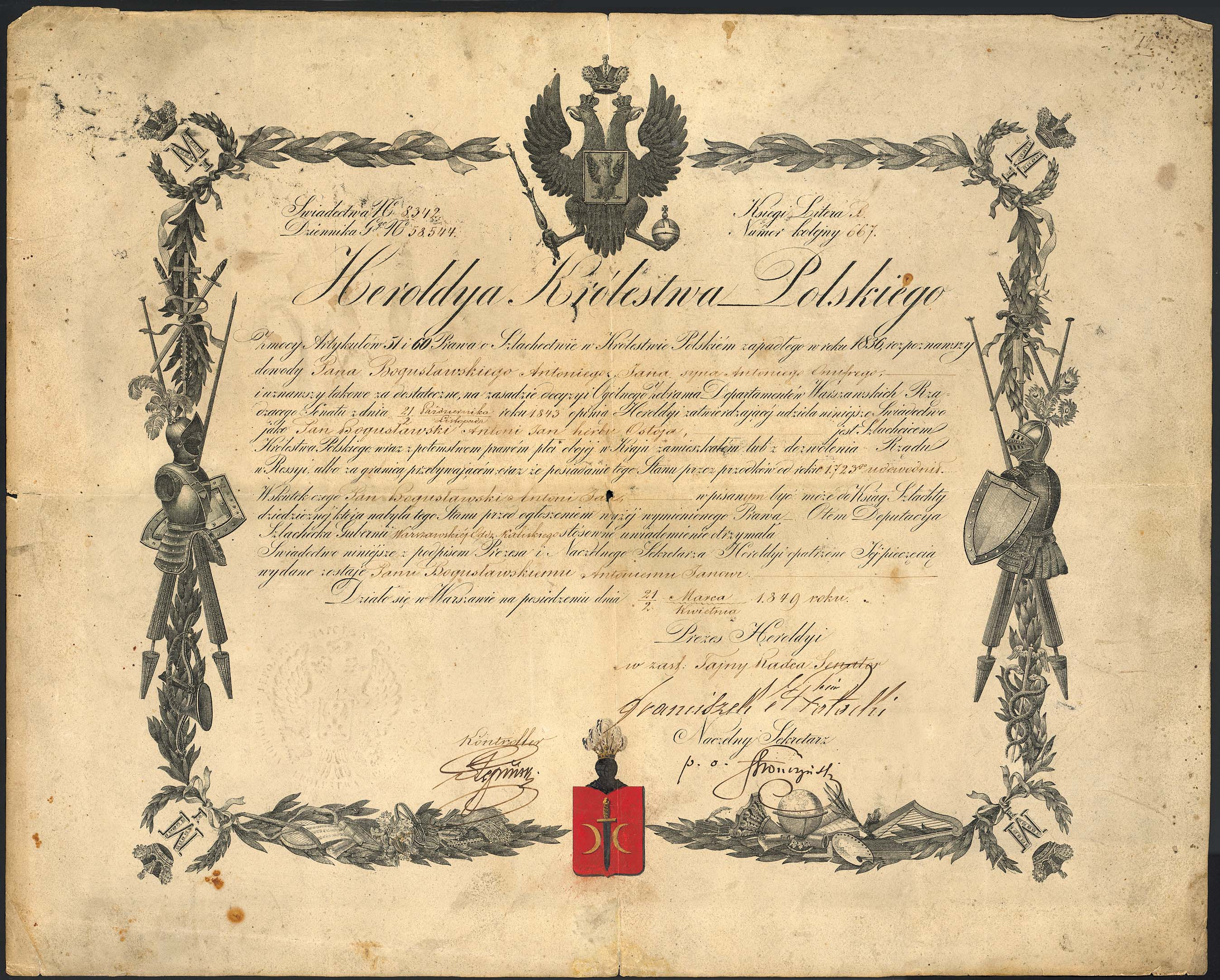
Certificate of nobility of Antoni Jan Bogusławski (1846)

Legitimation of nobility is the process of verifying nobility before the heraldry office to officially confirm nobility.

== History ==
In the Polish-Lithuanian Commonwealth, the legitimation of nobility was unknown due to the lack of a heraldry office. The role of official confirmation of nobility was then performed by a reprimand. In the period of the Partitions, the legitimation of nobility was used by heraldries of all the partitioned states: In the Russian partition, the heraldry of the Russian Empire operated. In the Kingdom of Poland, the Heroldia of the Kingdom of Poland operated between 1832 and 1861. Requirements Legitimation of nobility often required proof not only of noble origin, but also of landed property. This was a prerequisite for official confirmation of nobility status.

== Gallery ==
other documents legitimation
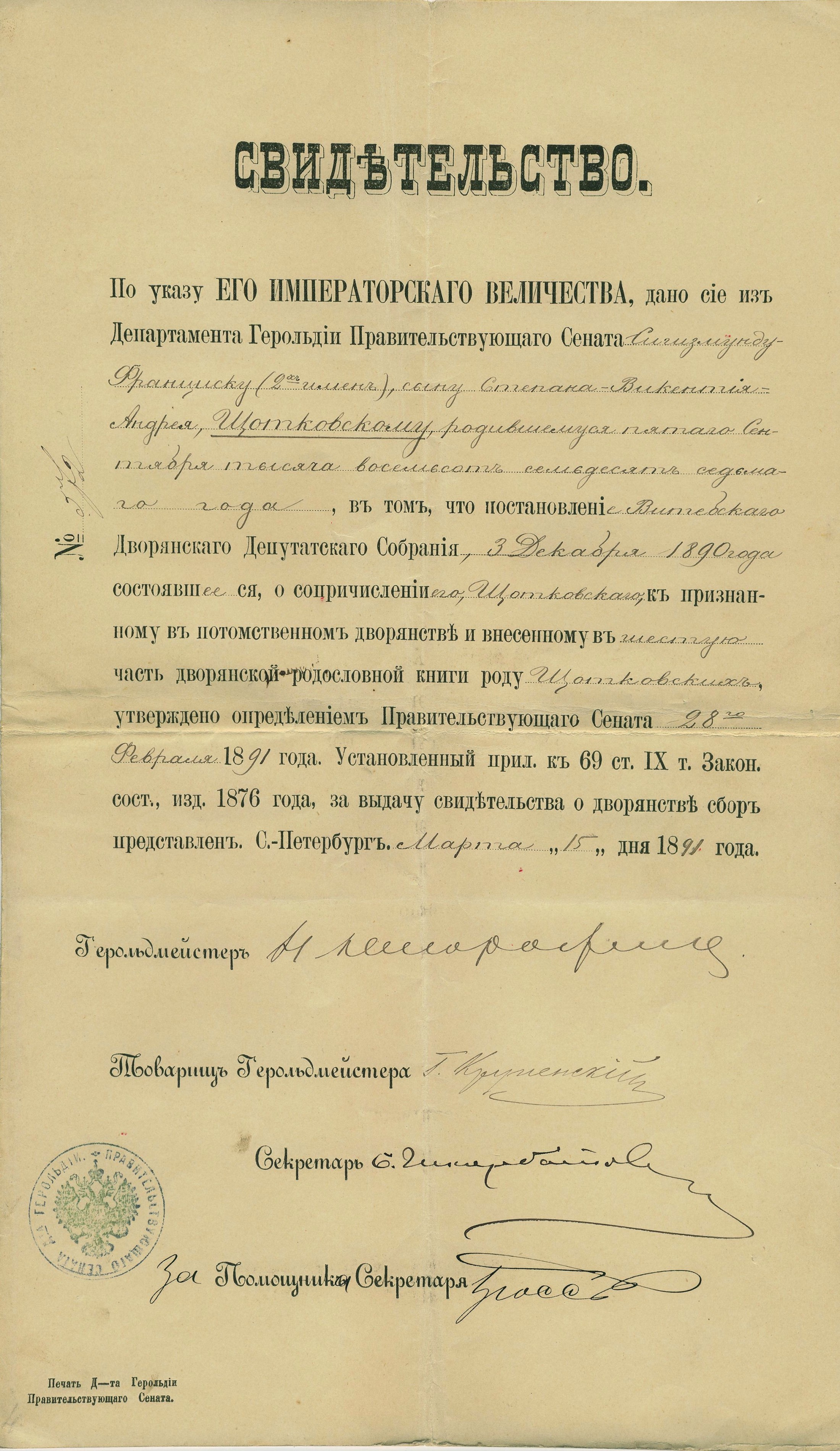
"Sviditielstvo" of the Russian heraldry from 1891

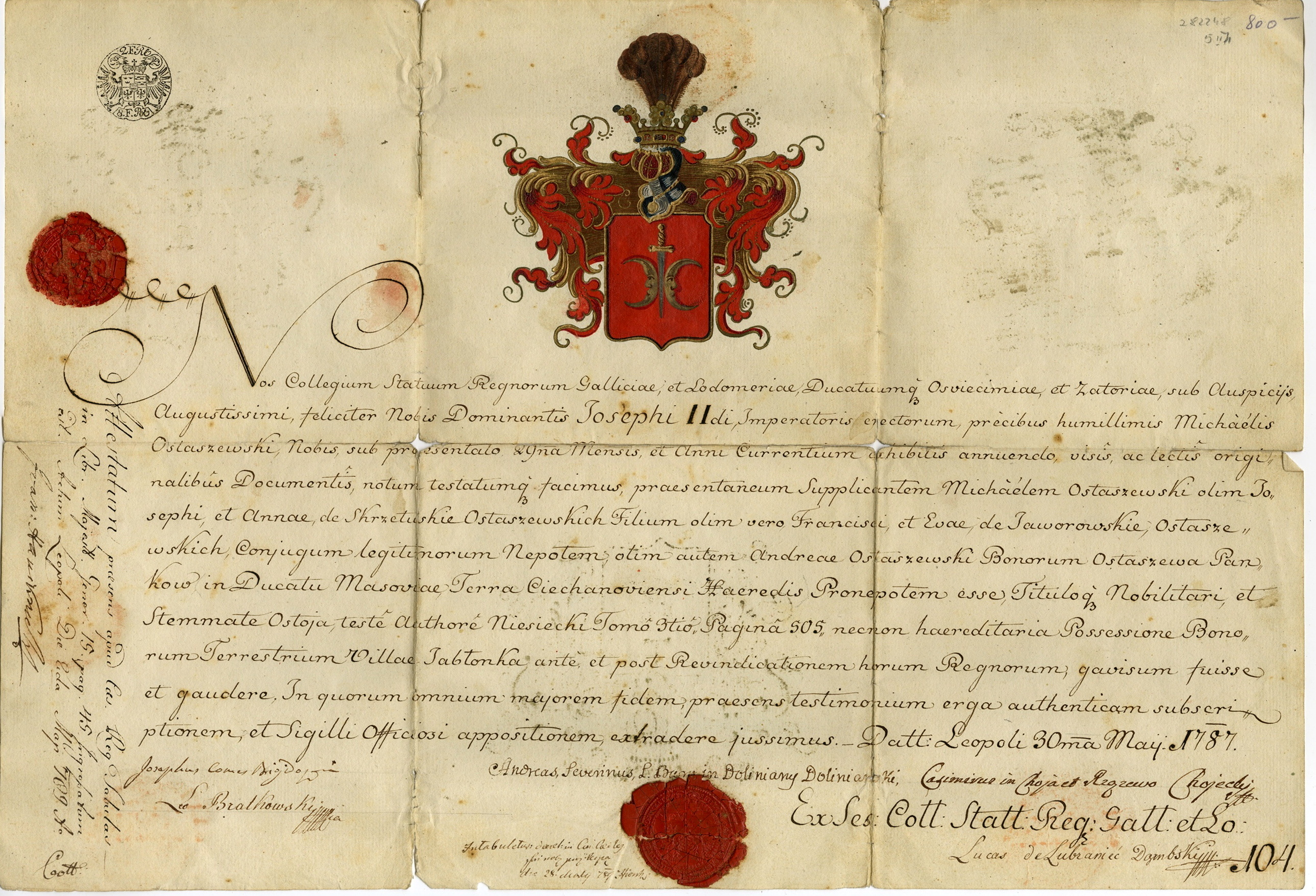
State certificate from Austrian occupation
